Senaka Dissanayake (born 21 June 1965) is a Sri Lankan former first-class cricketer who played for Burgher Recreation Club and Kandy Cricket Club.

References

External links
 

1965 births
Living people
Sri Lankan cricketers
Burgher Recreation Club cricketers
Kandy Cricket Club cricketers
Sportspeople from Kandy